Aatsista-Mahkan or Running Rabbit ( 1833 – probably 24 January 1911) was a chief of the Siksika First Nation. He was the son of Akamukai (Many Swans), chief of the  Biters band, and following the death of his father in 1871, Aatsista-Mahkan took control of the band. He was known for his generosity and kindness, and for his loyal protection of his family.

In 1877, he was a signatory to Treaty 7, but he and his people continued to follow the bison until 1881, when he and his people were designated to settle on a reserve, 60 miles east of today's Calgary, Alberta.

Early life
Running Rabbit was born into a prominent family. His older brother Many Swans, who took their father's name, was chief of Biters band of Siksikas to which they belonged. As a teenager and young warrior, Running Rabbit had not performed any great deeds worthy of recognition until his brother lent him an amulet said to have spiritual powers made from a mirror decorated with eagle feathers, ermine skins, and magpie feathers. Running Rabbit was successful during his first ever raid as a warrior, gaining himself two enemy horses which he captured and gifted to Many Swans. Similar success during following expeditions resulted in Many Swans giving Running Rabbit the amulet as a gift. Word of Running Rabbit's success spread throughout the Biters band and many referred to him as the "young chief" before he earned or was appointed any leadership position in the band.

Chief of the Biters band
During the autumn of 1871, chief Many Swans, the chief of the Biters band of the Siksika nation and brother of Running Rabbit, died resulting in Running Rabbit being appointed as chief of the biters. During his career as a band chief he was noted for his kindness, generosity and intelligence.

Due to his intelligence and kindness, Running Rabbit was often looked upon to settle disputes within the band and nation. One incident happened during the early 1870s along the Oldman River where a man from the biters band accidentally killed one of Crowfoot's daughters with a loaded gun. The man hid from Crowfoot who sought to kill him in retaliation in Running Rabbit's teepee. Running Rabbit stressed to Crowfoot that the killing was an accident and gave Crowfoot some horses as added compensation. Though usually peaceful in settling disputes Running Rabbit resorted to violence when the well being of his family was threatened, a noted incident involved Running Rabbit shooting a fellow Indian for beating his blind brother with a whip.

Treaty No.7 signing
Running Rabbit signed Treaty No.7 with the Canadian government alongside other Siksika nation chiefs including Crowfoot and Old Sun. The treaty promised the Blackfoot Confederacy reserve lands, hunting rights, trapping rights, and annual provisions/and or payments from the Queen in exchange for all of the traditional territory of the confederacy with the exception of lands set aside for reservations. Running Rabbit was recognized as a minor Siksika chief and was listed as having 90 followers. Running Rabbit and his band continued to live a traditional nomadic lifestyle until the last bison herds within the area were destroyed in 1881, resulting in his band and others of the Siksika nation settling on their previously set aside reserve 60 miles east of Calgary Alberta. On the reservation Running Rabbit was noted for trying to adapt to a new lifestyle which was forced upon them, becoming a noted farmer in 1887.

Later life and death
In 1892 after the death of head chief No-okska-stumik (Three Bulls), Running Rabbit was appointed as one of the two head chiefs of the Siksika nation alongside fellow chief Old Sun. He remained known for his wisdom, kindness and progressiveness. In 1898 he had made enough money harvesting hay to buy a high top buggy. Running Rabbit died in 1911.

References

Indigenous leaders in Alberta
Siksika Nation people
1830s births
1911 deaths
Year of birth uncertain